Zvenella is a genus of crickets in the tribe Podoscirtini.  Species have been recorded in: southern China, Indochina and Sumatra.

Species 
The Orthoptera Species File includes the following species:
species group Group I (temporary name)
 Zvenella acutangulata Xia, Liu & Yin, 1991
 Zvenella aequalis Ma & Zhang, 2012
 Zvenella chopardi Gorochov, 2002
 Zvenella cognata Gorochov, 1992
 Zvenella decussatus Ma & Zhang, 2012
 Zvenella geniculata (Chopard, 1931)
 Zvenella modesta Gorochov, 2002
 Zvenella pulchella Gorochov, 1988
 Zvenella scalpratus Ma & Zhang, 2012
 Zvenella transversa Ingrisch, 1997
 Zvenella yunnana (Gorochov, 1985) - type species (as Madasumma yunnana Gorochov)
species group Group II (temporary name)
 Zvenella albomaculata (Chopard, 1969)
 Zvenella malayana Gorochov, 2002
 Zvenella taynguyena Gorochov, 1990
species group Group III (temporary name)
 Zvenella parcevenosa (Chopard, 1931)
 Zvenella reticulata Gorochov, 2002

References

External links
 

Ensifera genera
crickets
Orthoptera of Indo-China